Colonel Blimp is a British cartoon character.

Colonel Blimp may refer to:

 The Life and Death of Colonel Blimp, a 1943 British romantic drama war film
 Colonel Blimp (production company), the video production branch of the British production company Blink

See also
 Blimp (disambiguation)